Xenophobia (from Ancient Greek ξένος (xénos) 'strange, foreign, alien', and φόβος (phóbos) 'fear') is the fear or hatred of any cultural group in the United States which is perceived as being foreign or strange or un-American. It expresses a conflict between an ingroup and an outgroup and may manifest in suspicion by the one of the other's activities, and beliefs and goals. It includes a desire to eliminate their presence, and fear of losing national, ethnic, or racial identity.

Know-Nothing Party, 1854-1856
The Know Nothing party was a nativist political party in the mid-1850s. It carried many state and local elections in 1864-55, but failed to pass major laws and suddenly collapsed.

Know Nothing agitators proclaimed that a "Romanist" conspiracy headed by the Pope in Rome was in control of by Catholic immigrants. The goal was to subvert civil and religious liberty and destroy Protestantism. In response it was urgent to politically organize native-born Protestants. The Know Nothing movement emphasized that Irish Catholic priests and bishops would control a large bloc of voters in the Democratic Party. Henry Winter Davis, an active Know-Nothing, was elected on the American Party ticket to Congress from Maryland. He told Congress in late 1856 that the un-American  Irish Catholic immigrants were to blame for the recent election of Democrat James Buchanan as president, stating: The recent election has developed in an aggravated form every evil against which the American party protested. Foreign allies have decided the government of the country -- men naturalized in thousands on the eve of the election. Again in the fierce struggle for supremacy, men have forgotten the ban which the Republic puts on the intrusion of religious influence on the political arena. These influences have brought vast multitudes of foreign-born citizens to the polls, ignorant of American interests, without American feelings, influenced by foreign sympathies, to vote on American affairs; and those votes have, in point of fact, accomplished the present result.

In the South, the party did not emphasize anti-Catholicism but instead attacked corrupt Democratic politicians and filled the vacuum caused by the collapse of the Whig Party. The ideology and influence lasted only one or two years before it disintegrated due to weak and inexperienced elected officials who were unable to pass legislation, and a deep split over the issue of slavery.

Asian targets

Anti-Chinese

In the 1870s and 1880s in the Western states, ethnic Whites especially Irish Americans targeted violence against Chinese workers, driving them out of smaller towns. They relocated into districts of a few larger cities called "Chinatowns."  Denis Kearney, an immigrant from Ireland, led a mass movement in San Francisco in the 1870s that incited racist attacks on the Chinese there and threatened public officials and railroad owners. The Chinese Exclusion Act of 1882 was the first of many nativist acts of Congress which attempted to limit the flow of immigrants into the U.S.. The Chinese responded to it by filing false claims of American birth, enabling thousands of them to immigrate to California. The exclusion of the Chinese caused the western railroads to begin importing Mexican railroad workers in greater numbers ("traqueros").  In 1943 when China was an ally against Japan, the restrictions were repealed and Chinese could become citizens.

Anti-Japanese

Attacks on the Japanese in the Western U.S., echoing the dreaded Yellow Peril became increasingly xenophobic after the unexpected Japanese triumph over the supposedly powerful Russian Empire in the Russo-Japanese War of 1904-1905. In October, 1906, the San Francisco Board of Education passed a regulation whereby children of Japanese descent would be required to attend racially segregated and separate schools. At the time, Japanese immigrants made up 1% of the state's population; many of them had come under the treaty in 1894 which had assured free immigration from Japan. In 1907, nativists rioted up and down the West Coast demanding exclusion of Japanese immigrants and imposition of segregated schools for Caucasian and Japanese students. 

The California Alien Land Law of 1913 was specifically created to prevent land ownership among Japanese citizens who were residing in the state of California.  In 1918 courts ruled that American-born children had the right to own land.  California proceeded to strengthen its Alien land law in 1920 and 1923 and other states followed.

According to Gary Y. Okihiro, the Japanese government subsidized Japanese writers in America especially Kiyoshi Kawakami and Yamato Ichihashi to refute the hostile stereotypes and establish a favorable image of Japanese in the American mind. Thus Kawakami's books especially Asia at the Door (1914) and The Real Japanese Question (1921) tried to refute the false accusations. The publicists confronted the main allegations regarding lack of assimilation, and boasted of the positive Japanese contributions to American economy and society, especially in Hawaii and California.

Emergency Quota Act

Trump administration

Immigration policy, including illegal immigration to the United States, was a signature issue of President Donald Trump's presidential campaign, and his proposed reforms and remarks about this issue generated much publicity.  Trump has repeatedly said that illegal immigrants are criminals. Critics have argued that there is an increasing amount of evidence that immigration does not correlate with higher crime rates. 

A hallmark promise of his campaign was the Trump wall, a much expanded barrier on the United States–Mexico border and to force Mexico to pay for the wall. Trump has also expressed support for a variety of "limits on legal immigration and guest-worker visas", including a pause on granting green cards, which Trump says will lower immigration levels to historical averages. 

As president, Trump imposed a travel ban that prohibited issuing visas to citizens of seven largely-Muslim countries expanded to thirteen in 2020.  In response to legal challenges he revised the ban twice, with his third version being upheld by the Supreme Court in June 2018.

He attempted to end the Deferred Action for Childhood Arrivals program, but a legal injunction has allowed the policy to continue while the matter is the subject of legal challenge. He imposed a "zero tolerance" policy to require the arrest of anyone caught illegally crossing the border, which resulted in separating children from their families.

On January 30, 2018, Trump outlined his administration's four pillars for immigration reform: (1) a path to citizenship for DREAMers; (2) increased border security funding; (3) ending the diversity visa lottery; and (4) restrictions on family-based immigration.

Trump's position was strongly supported by conservative voters. Studies found the higher voters' xenophobia was, the higher was their support for political violence.

Current status
A network of more than 300 US-based civil rights and human rights organizations stated in a 2010 report that "Discrimination permeates all aspects of life in the United States, and it extends to all communities of color." Discrimination against racial, ethnic, and religious minorities is widely acknowledged, especially in the case of Indians, Muslims, Sikhs as well as other ethnic groups.

Members of every major American ethnic and religious minority group have perceived discrimination in their dealings with members of other minority racial and religious groups. Philosopher Cornel West has stated that "racism is an integral element within the very fabric of American culture and society. It is embedded in the country's first collective definition, enunciated in its subsequent laws, and imbued in its dominant way of life."

A 2019 survey by the Pew Research Center suggested that 76% of black and Asian respondents had experienced some form of discrimination, at least from time to time. Studies from PNAS and Nature have found that during traffic stops, officers spoke to black men in a less respectful tone than they did to white men and that black drivers are more likely to be pulled over and searched by police than white drivers. Black people are also reportedly overrepresented as criminals in the media. In 2020 the COVID-19 epidemic was often blamed on China, leading to attacks on Chinese Americans. This represents a continuation of xenophobic attacks on Chinese Americans for 150 years.

See also
 Anti-Catholicism in the United States
 Anti-Irish sentiment 
 Anti-Italianism
 Antisemitism in the United States
 Definitions of whiteness in the United States
 Great replacement in the United States
 History of homeland security in the United States
 Know Nothing
 Nativism in United States politics
 Immigration reduction in the United States

References

Further reading
 Anbinder, Tyler. "Nativism and prejudice against immigrants," in A companion to American immigration, ed. by Reed Ueda (2006) pp. 177–201 excerpt
 Anbinder, Tyler. Nativism and slavery: the northern Know Nothings and the politics of the 1850s (Oxford UP, 1992).

 Atkins, Stephen E. Encyclopedia of Modern American Extremists and Extremist Groups (2002) short summary for 275 groups, plus citations for further study. online

 Awan, Muhammad Safeer. "Global terror and the rise of xenophobia/Islamophobia: An analysis of American cultural production since September 11." Islamic Studies (2010): 521–537. online
 Baker, Joseph O., David Cañarte, and L. Edward Day. "Race, xenophobia, and punitiveness among the American public." Sociological Quarterly 59.3 (2018): 363–383. online
 Bennett, David H. The Party of Fear: The American Far Right from Nativism to the Militia Movement (U of North Carolina Press, 1988). excerpt

 Billington, Ray Allen. The Protestant Crusade: 1800-1860 (1938) online

 Clermont, Kevin M., and Theodore Eisenberg. "Xenophilia in American Courts" Harvard Law Review 109 (1996) 1120–1143. online DOI: 10.2307/1342264 Argues xenophobia is NOT rampant in American courts; foreigners more often win than Americans. ("Xenophiolia" means being friendly toward foreigners.)
 Finzsch, Norbert, and Dietmar Schirmer, eds. Identity and intolerance: nationalism, racism, and xenophobia in Germany and the United States (Cambridge UP, 2002) 16 essays by scholars.
 FitzGerald, David Scott, and David Cook-Martín. Culling the Masses: The Democratic Origins of Racist Immigration Policy in the Americas (Harvard UP, 2014) excerpt
 , in United States.
 Goodman, Adam. The Deportation Machine: America's Long History of Expelling Immigrants (Princeton UP, 2020) excerpt

 Higham, John. Strangers in the land: Patterns of American nativism, 1860-1925 (1955), highly influential classic online
 Kenny, Kevin. "Mobility and Sovereignty: The Nineteenth-Century Origins of Immigration Restriction." Journal of American History 109.2 (2022): 284-297. https://doi.org/10.1093/jahist/jaac233

 Lee, Erika. "America first, immigrants last: American xenophobia then and now." Journal of the Gilded Age and Progressive Era 19.1 (2020): 3–18. online
 Lee, Erika. "Americans Must Rule America: Xenophobia in the United States." Social Research 88.4 (2021): 795-825.

 Lee, Erika. America for Americans: A History of Xenophobia in the United States (2019). The major scholarly history; excerpt;  also see online review
 Lee, Erika. At America's Gates: Chinese Immigration during the Exclusion Era, 1882-1943 (2003).

 Lipset, Seymour M., and Earl Raab.  The Politics of Unreason: Right-Wing Extremism in America, 1790–1970 (1970). online

 Makari, George. Of Fear and Strangers: A History of Xenophobia (2021), scholarly history focused on US and Europe; excerpt
 Oxx, Katie. The nativist movement in America: religious conflict in the 19th century (Routledge, 2013). excerpt
 Pruitt, Nicholas T. Open Hearts, Closed Doors: Immigration Reform and the Waning of Mainline Protestantism (NYU Press, 2021).

 Ullah, Inayat, and Kulsoom Shahzor. "Cultural (Mis) Appropriation, Ideological Essentialism and Language: Analysis of Stereotyping in Hollywood Movie." International Journal of English Linguistics 6.7 (2017): 171–177. online

Historiography and memory
 Bergquist, James M. "The Concept of Nativism in Historical Study Since" Strangers in the Land". American Jewish History 76.2 (1986): 125–141. online

 Higham, John. "Instead of a Sequel, or How I Lost My Subject." Reviews in American History 28.2 (2000): 327-339. online

 Nugent, Walter. The tolerant populists: Kansas populism and nativism (U of Chicago Press, 2013). Rejects the argumnent of Richard Hofstadter that Populists were xenophobic 

Xenophobia
Racism
Phobias
Strangers